The tornado outbreak sequence of June 10–16, 1970 was an outbreak sequence of 82 tornadoes that touched down in the Great Plains and Midwest. At least 26 significant tornadoes (F2+) touched down during the outbreak sequence.

Confirmed tornadoes

June 10 event

June 11 event

June 12 event

June 13 event

June 14 event

June 15 event

June 16 event

See also
 List of North American tornadoes and tornado outbreaks

References

Tornadoes of 1970
June 1970 events in the United States
Tornadoes in the United States
Tornadoes in North Dakota
Tornadoes in Utah
Tornadoes in Kansas
Tornadoes in Nebraska
Tornadoes in Oklahoma
Tornadoes in Arkansas
Tornadoes in Ohio
Tornadoes in Missouri
Tornadoes in Florida
Tornadoes in Iowa
Tornadoes in South Dakota
Tornadoes in Kentucky
Tornadoes in Illinois
Tornadoes in Indiana
Tornadoes in Minnesota
1970 natural disasters in the United States